Uspenovka is a rural locality (a selo) in Uspenovsky Selsoviet of Belogorsky District, Amur Oblast, Russia. The population was 319 as of 2018. There are 5 streets.

Geography 
Uspenovka is located on the right bank of the Belaya River, 49 km southeast of Belogorsk (the district's administrative centre) by road. Srednebeloye is the nearest rural locality.

References 

Rural localities in Belogorsky District